Juraj Sagan (born 23 December 1988 in Žilina) is a Slovak former professional road bicycle racer, who competed as a professional from 2010 to 2022, for the , ,  and  teams. During his professional career, Sagan took four victories – all of which were at the Slovak National Road Race Championships, in 2016, 2017, 2019 and 2020.

Following his retirement, Sagan now works as a directeur sportif for UCI Continental team .

Personal life
His younger brother, Peter Sagan, has also competed professionally as a cyclist, winning more than 100 races, including three consecutive world titles between 2017 and 2019.

Major results
Source: 

2006
 1st Stage 1 La Coupe du Président de la Ville de Grudziądz
 9th Road race, UCI Junior World Championships
2007
 9th Overall Grand Prix Cycliste de Gemenc
2008
 5th Road race, National Road Championships
 8th Grand Prix Bradlo
2009
 1st GP Boka
 4th Road race, National Road Championships
 7th Rund um den Finanzplatz Eschborn-Frankfurt U23
 8th Trofeo Banca Popolare di Vicenza
2010
 5th Rund um den Finanzplatz Eschborn-Frankfurt U23
 6th Giro del Veneto
2011
 4th Road race, National Road Championships
2015
 2nd Road race, National Road Championships
2016
 1st  Road race, National Road Championships
 1st Stage 5 (TTT) Tour of Croatia
2017
 1st  Road race, National Road Championships
2018
 2nd Road race, National Road Championships
 10th Grand Prix of Aargau Canton
2019
 1st  Road race, National Road Championships
2020
 1st  Road race, National Road Championships

Grand Tour general classification results timeline

References

External links 

 velonation

1988 births
Living people
Sportspeople from Žilina
Slovak male cyclists
Olympic cyclists of Slovakia
Cyclists at the 2020 Summer Olympics
Directeur sportifs